Sarah-Jane Dias is an Indian actress, host, VJ and former beauty queen. She was the winner of Femina Miss India 2007 and was a VJ for Channel V.

Early life
Sarah-Jane Dias was born in Muscat, Oman. Her father, Eustace Dias, is a marketing manager with Oilfields Supply Centre and her mother is named Yolanda. She also has a sister named Elena Rose Dias.

Dias attended Indian School Al Wadi Al Kabir until Grade 10, then she joined Indian School, Muscat doing her 11th and 12th. She then attended university at Mumbai's St. Andrews College. Prior to winning Miss India World title in 2007, she had won the Miss India Oman title in 1997.

Career

Modelling
In Mumbai, Dias was discovered by Suresh Natrajan by chance when she walked onto his set and was immediately hired for the campaign he was shooting. At the age of 21, she won a talent hunt TV show, which gave her a chance to host a Channel V show. She then became the host of Get Gorgeous, a supermodel hunt TV show on the network.

In 2006, Dias featured in the music video for Australian rock group INXS's "Never Let You Go" from their album Switch.

The next year Dias participated in Femina Miss India 2007. She subsequently won the title of Femina Miss India World 2007 and represented the country at Miss World 2007 but did not place.

Acting
Dias scored her first major film role in the 2010 Tamil romantic comedy film, Theeradha Vilaiyattu Pillai opposite Vishal Reddy. She appeared in a Telugu film named Panjaa with Pawan Kalyan which was released in 2011. She also appeared in the Hindi films like Game opposite Abhishek Bachchan and Kyaa Super Kool Hai Hum opposite Ritesh Deshmukh in 2012 and in O Teri opposite Pulkit Samrat in 2014. In 2016, she appeared in a Musical Thriller Film Zubaan, which was released in March 2016. In 2015 she led in Angry Indian Goddesses She was currently seen in The British-Indian historical film Viceroy's House.

Filmography

Films

Television

References

External links

 
 Official website

Year of birth missing (living people)
Living people
People from Muscat, Oman
Indian expatriates in Oman
Actresses from Mangalore
Femina Miss India winners
Miss World 2007 delegates
Mithibai College alumni
St. Andrew's College of Arts, Science and Commerce alumni
Indian film actresses
Indian television actresses
Indian web series actresses
Actresses in Hindi cinema
Actresses in Tamil cinema
Actresses in Telugu cinema
Actresses in Hindi television
Female models from Karnataka
Indian VJs (media personalities)
21st-century Indian actresses